The 177th Information Warfare Aggressor Squadron is a unit of the 184th Intelligence Wing of the Kansas Air National Guard stationed at McConnell Air Force Base, Wichita, Kansas. The 177th is a non-flying squadron which trains in cyber warfare.

Overview
The mission of the squadron is to attack American military networks, to discover vulnerabilities before a real enemy does.

The Information Warfare Aggressor role is similar to the "tiger teams" commercial firms hire (and the air force pioneered) to test the defenses of corporate networks. The two aggressor squadrons have increased the quality and quantity of attacks that can be launched against U.S. systems, to see how well the defenses hold up. Members of the squadron then analyze the results of their attack. Finally, the aggressor hackers tell the sysadmins and other concerned personnel of the target unit what they did wrong, and why.

History
On 1 February 1984, the 177th Tactical Fighter Training Squadron was established with the unit flying McDonnell F-4 Phantom IIs as a formal training unit.  It conducted its first student training class the same year.  The squadron converted to the General Dynamics F-16A Fighting Falcon in 1990 and the F-16CC and F-16Din 1992.  It was inactivated on 1 August 1994 when the F-16s were withdrawn from McConnell and its parent group became a bomber unit flying B-1B Lancers.

Lineage
 Constituted as the  177th Tactical Fighter Training Squadron and allotted to the National Guard on 1 February 1984
 Activated and extended federal recognition on 8 February 1984
 Redesignated 177th Fighter Squadron on 16 March 1992
 Inactivated on 1 August 1994
 Redesignated: 177th Information Warfare Aggressor Squadron and activated on 30 August 2002

Assignments
 184th Tactical Fighter Group (later 184th Fighter Group), 1 February 1984 – 1 August 1994
 184th Regional Support Group, 30 August 2006 – 2018
 184th Cyber Operations Group, 2018 - Present

Stations 
 McConnell Air Force Base, Kansas, 1 February 1984 – 1 August 1994
 McConnell Air Force Base, Kansas, 1 August 2002 – present

Aircraft
 McDonnell F-4D Phantom II, 1984–1990
 Block 1/5 F-16A and F-16B Fighting Falcon, 1990–1992
 Block 25 F-16C and F-16D Fighting Falcon, 1992–1994

See also
 List of cyber warfare forces

References

 

Squadrons of the United States Air National Guard
Information Aggressor 0177
Military units and formations in Kansas
Military units and formations established in 1984
1984 establishments in Kansas